Dolphin School is the name of a number of schools in the United Kingdom:

 Dolphin School (Battersea)
 Dolphin School, Hurst (Berkshire)
 Dolphin School (Nottinghamshire)

Dolphin School may also refer to:

 Dolphin Public School Chipiyana, a school in Uttar Pradesh, India
 Dolphin Senior Public School, a school in Ontario, Canada